Nicole Houde (November 1, 1945 – February 2, 2016) was a Quebec writer.

The daughter of Thérèse Simard and Roland Houde, she was born in Saint-Fulgence and studied education at the École normale Bon-Pasteur and anthropology at the Université de Montréal. Her short stories have been published in various periodicals including Moebius, Arcade and Un Lac, un Fjord. Her first novel La malentendue, published in 1983, received the Prix des Jeunes Écrivains of the Journal de Montréal.

Selected works 
 La Maison du remous (1986), received the Prix Hervé-Foulon in 2013
 L'Enfant de la batture (1989), received the Prix Air Canada and was a finalist for the Molson Prize
 Lettres à cher Alain (1990)
 Les Inconnus du jardin, novel (1991), was a finalist for the Molson Prize
 Les Oiseaux de Saint-John Perse (1994), received the Governor General's Award for French-language fiction
 La chanson de Violetta (1998)
 Je pense à toi (2008)
Source for works:

References 

1945 births
2016 deaths
Canadian novelists in French
Canadian short story writers in French
Canadian women novelists
Canadian women short story writers
Université de Montréal alumni
People from Saguenay–Lac-Saint-Jean
Writers from Quebec
20th-century Canadian novelists
20th-century Canadian women writers
21st-century Canadian novelists
21st-century Canadian women writers
Governor General's Award-winning fiction writers
20th-century Canadian short story writers
21st-century Canadian short story writers